New Hampshire College of Agriculture and the Mechanic Arts (NHC) was founded and incorporated in 1866, as a land grant college  in Hanover in connection with Dartmouth College. In 1893, NHC moved to Durham, where it became the University of New Hampshire (UNH) in 1923, by an act of the New Hampshire General Court.

History

The Morrill Act of 1862 granted federal lands to New Hampshire for the establishment of an agricultural-mechanical college. The state incorporated New Hampshire College in 1866 and opened the college in 1868 in Hanover. The institution was officially associated with Dartmouth College and was directed by Dartmouth's president.

Durham resident Benjamin Thompson left his farm and assets to the state for the establishment of an agricultural college. On January 30, 1890, Thompson died and his will became public. On March 5, 1891, Governor Hiram A. Tuttle signed an act accepting the conditions of Thompson's will. On April 10, 1891, Tuttle signed a bill authorizing the college's move to Durham.

Excited about the pending move to Durham, the Class of 1892 held commencement exercises in an unfinished barn on the Durham campus. On April 18, 1892, the Board of Trustees voted to "authorize the faculty to make all the arrangements for the packing and removal of college property at Hanover to Durham." In fall of 1893, classes began in Durham with 51 freshmen and 13 upperclassmen, and graduate study was established. In 1923, Governor Fred H. Brown signed a bill changing the name of the college to University of New Hampshire, despite pressure by state agriculture interests that had defeated a similar proposal in 1911. The university was incorporated on July 1, 1923.

References

Defunct universities and colleges in New Hampshire
Dartmouth College history
History of New Hampshire
University of New Hampshire
Embedded educational institutions
Educational institutions established in 1866
1866 establishments in New Hampshire